General elections were held in Bolivia on 18 December 2005. Evo Morales of the Movement for Socialism (MAS) party was elected President of Bolivia with 54% of the vote, the first time a candidate had received an absolute majority since the flawed 1978 elections. Morales was sworn in on 22 January 2006 for a five-year term. The MAS also won a majority of seats in the Chamber of Deputies and emerged as the largest party in the Senate.

Simultaneously voters elected prefects, the highest executive office in each of Bolivia's nine departments. This was the first time the office had been chosen at the ballot box. Subsequently, departmental elections were held separately from national elections, with the next one held in April 2010.

Background
In the early 2000s there were high levels of political instability across the country, including five Presidents in four years. Much of the instability dates back to the economic reforms otherwise known as "shock therapy" implemented by President Gonzalo Sánchez de Lozada whereby many formerly public utilities were privatized.

These reforms ultimately led to the First Bolivian Gas War in October 2003 where protesters, many of them of indigenous descent, essentially forced the resignation of Sánchez de Lozada. Vice President Carlos Mesa took office as president.

In his year in office, Mesa held a national referendum on the prospect of the nationalization of the hydrocarbons industry which he claimed to have won. Critics however said that the questions were vague and ambiguous with regard to outright nationalization of the hydrocarbons industry.

In May 2005 the Second Bolivian Gas War began after Congress agreed to raise taxes on foreign companies from 18% to 32%. The unions, led by Evo Morales, felt the law did not go far enough and effectively shut down the country, blockading major roads and cutting off the food supplies of several large cities.

In June 2005 the protests ultimately led to Mesa's resignation. Supreme Court Chief Justice Eduardo Rodríguez assumed the position of interim President of the Republic after the presidents of both the Senate and Chamber of Deputies declined the position and Rodríguez was fourth in line of succession.

Viewed as an apolitical figure, Rodríguez was welcomed by protesters and called for the presidential elections slated to take place in 2007 to be brought forward to December 2005.

Electoral system
Voters had two ballots; a national-level ballot to elect the President and the nationally-elected members of Congress, and one for members of Congress elected in single-member constituencies in the Chamber of Deputies. Senators and Deputies were returned on a departmental basis; Senators were elected on a majoritarian basis, with the first-place party receiving two and the second-place party one, while deputies were elected on a mixed-member basis, with district deputies joining list deputies awarded by compensatory proportional representation. However, there was no national distribution of seats.

Voting was compulsory for all Bolivians over the age of 18, but Bolivians living abroad were not able to take part.

Results

Aftermath
Morales claimed his victory marked Bolivia's first election of an indigenous head of state, but this claim generated controversy, due to the number of mestizo presidents who came before him, and was challenged publicly by such figures as Mario Vargas Llosa, who accused Morales of fomenting racial divisions in an increasingly mestizo Latin America.

References

External links
National Electoral Court of Bolivia (in Spanish) 
BBC "Crucial Choice for Bolivian Voters"
BBC "Q&A: Bolivian Elections"
CBC "Left-wing candidate favoured to win Bolivian election"
NPR's Weekend Edition: "Bolivians Vote for President"
NPR's All Things Considered "Bolivia Prepares for Presidential Election"
MAS Official Campaign Site

Bolivia
Presidential election
Elections in Bolivia
Evo Morales
2005